Prismatoolithidae is an oofamily of fossil eggs. They may have been laid by ornithopods or theropods.

References

Egg fossils
Dinosaur reproduction